Roll the Bones is the fourteenth studio album by Canadian rock band Rush, released September 3, 1991, on Anthem Records. The band began working on Roll the Bones after a brief creative hiatus following the tour promoting their previous release, Presto.

Roll the Bones was a return to commercial success for the band, reaching No. 3 in the United States, No. 10 in the UK, and No. 11 in Canada. The album won a Juno Award for Best Album Design at the 1992 awards. In August 2001, the album was certified platinum by the Recording Industry Association of America for selling one million copies in the US. It was remastered in 2004 and again in 2013 as part of The Studio Albums 1989–2007 box set. In 2015 it was reissued after being remastered by Sean Magee at Abbey Road Studios following a direct approach by Rush to remaster their entire back catalogue.

Background and writing
In June 1990, Rush finished touring their previous album, Presto (1989). They purposely kept the tour short, which Lee said was due to the group feeling overcautious about touring the album. However, it became an enjoyable and positive experience for them, and by the time it finished "we were so charged up we wanted to keep on playing." This renewed energy in the band carried through to the writing and recording sessions for Roll the Bones. They then took a break, but decided to cut it short in order to start work on new material for a follow-up record.

As with Presto, Rush started work by retreating to Chalet Studios, a remote studio in Claremont, Ontario. They stayed for  months, with Lee and Lifeson working on the music while Peart wrote lyrics. The three would reconvene in the evening where Peart would hear what the other two had come up with during the day. Lee had developed an interest in bird watching, and ensured some broken bird feeders by the studio window were repaired and filled with feed, which he enjoyed to observe while writing. The album's liner notes include a thanks to birds.

The demos were recorded using an eight-track Tascam 388 recorder and an integrated mixer hooked up to a sequencer running C-Lab Notator software. Lee set up simple drum patterns on the computer for Lifeson and himself to work from. It took between nine and ten weeks to write and rehearse for the album, and eight weeks to record it.

The album displays the continued change in the group's sound which started on Presto, with a reduction in keyboards and a return to guitar-driven songs. Lee said the change was "a backlash against the more computer-style of writing" which had dominated their sound through the 1980s, and instead used synthesizers and sequencers as an "orchestration device" rather than a key component in the songwriting. The writing sessions for Presto had involved just bass, guitar, and vocals which contributed to the style shift, and the group continued with this approach for Roll the Bones. Another aspect that carried over from Presto was Lee's intention to come up with strong vocal melodies at the beginning and base the rest of the tune around it. Lifeson had wanted to try playing funk rhythms and having attempted it on Presto, wished to explore it further on Roll the Bones. The majority of the arrangements worked out at the writing stage remained unchanged which allowed the group to use the demos as a guide for recording, done by transferring the completed demos to 24-track and re-recording the parts.

The album contains a running lyrical theme concerning the element of chance in different aspects of life, which Peart had devised while experimenting with lyrics. The first lyric that he wrote for the album was used on "Face Up", specifically: "Turn it up – or turn that wild card down." He recalled sitting on his cottage floor "with a pile of papers around me" of notes from the previous two years, mostly consisting of phrases written on tour or during "that dreamlike moment before sleep." He started to experiment with the phrases "turn it up" and "turn it down" which led to the idea of turning a card down and a wild card, and applied them to events that a person may face.

Recording
Roll the Bones was recorded at Le Studio in Morin-Heights, Quebec, and McClear Place in Toronto, between February and May 1991. The band resumed working with co-producer Rupert Hine and engineer Stephen Tayler, both of whom had worked on Presto. The vocals were recorded in England. Rush wanted to continue to work with Hine due to his accomplished songwriting, the feedback he gave their songs and his ability for the group to achieve a looser sound than previous albums. Lee said that various production tricks they had learned from working with Peter Collins in the 1980s were used on Presto and Roll the Bones.

The bass and drum parts were put down in four days, and the guitars in eight. Lee was amazed at how Peart had learned his parts for an entire song prior to recording it, and that "Nine times out of 10 it took only one pass for him to nail it." The band had originally planned to release the album in January 1992, but they finished it two months early. They thanked the news channel CNN in the liner notes as they had the channel on while writing, and Lee recalled it was sometimes difficult to stop watching it while numerous events were taking place.

Lee used two different Wal basses on the album. He liked its mid-range and "rich" bottom end sound, and the fact that he did not have to add much equalisation. He first learned of the instrument when the band were recording in England, and knew that bassist Percy Jones used one on Brand X albums, of which he was a big fan. Lee played one at the suggestion of Peter Collins during the recording of Power Windows (1985). Lee's bass was mixed closer to Peart's bass drum range which freed up space in the music for guitar parts. Peart also changed his sound and did not make a conscious decision to avoid electronics altogether, but found that most of the songs did not benefit from him playing on an electronic kit and instead mostly used acoustic drums. Peart realized that he had the tendency for his drum parts to be "too organized, too architectural" on an album, so for Roll the Bones he deliberately had spots on songs that were unrehearsed and recorded them on the day of recording with the intention of capturing more spontaneous playing.

Peart wrote that the group found each stage of the recording process particularly enjoyable and satisfying, which sparked a "new conviction, a sense of rebirth" within the group. Lee described the writing sessions for the album as "very positive" and "optimistic".

Artwork
The cover was designed by longtime Rush associate Hugh Syme. The liner notes contain the cryptic phrase "Now it's dark." Peart later revealed that the phrase occurs in the 1986 mystery film Blue Velvet. The credits includes a running joke that began on Power Windows when the group noticed some songs beginning with the letter "M" and among "other reasons", they continued the gag on Roll the Bones with: "Brought to you by the letter B."

Songs

Side one
The opening verse of "Dreamline" has references to astronomy, which Peart was inspired by after cycling several hundred miles from Cincinnati to Columbus between two gigs on the Presto tour. Upon arrival he watched the popular science series Nova on the Public Broadcasting Service and a program on satellite imaging which captured his imagination.

"Bravado" deals with how one should not give up after failing, as opposed to ending life by suicide, which Peart had addressed in "The Pass" on Presto. The song was particularly emotional for Lee and rated it as one of the band's best ever songs partly due to its different texture than the rest of the album. The band was optimistic about its musical form, but faced the problem of overworking its arrangement because all the parts sounded good to them. In the end, they learned that by stripping the song back, it resulted in a stronger track.

"Roll the Bones" was named after a science fiction story by Fritz Lieber that Peart had read some 15 years prior titled Gonna Roll the Bones. Though the story had no influence on the music or its message, Peart took a liking to the particular phrase and had kept it in his notebook. The phrase is also a slang term for rolling dice.

When the band was recording "Roll the Bones", Lee said they decided to "have some fun" with it and included a rap section. Peart recalled some skepticism from his band mates at first and they tried different ways to present it, including a female voice, but "the transition was too harsh." They instead opted for Lee's voice with low-frequency effects applied to it.

"Where's My Thing?" was the band's first instrumental since "YYZ" from Moving Pictures (1981). It has a humorous subtitle of "Part IV, 'Gangster of Boats' Trilogy", referring to an inside joke where Lee and Lifeson threatened to name a Rush album Gangster of Boats if Peart has difficulty in coming up with a title, plus the fact that it's the fourth part of a trilogy. Peart wrote that the group had wanted to record an instrumental for a while at this point and that the group had "a lot of fun" recording it. They had wanted to do one for Presto, but every time Lee and Lifeson had a piece of music a lyric that Peart had written fit well together with it. This time around, Peart let the two write an instrumental track and deliberately avoided to feed them lyrics until they had put one together. Rather than making the track a showcase for the group's playing ability, Lee and Lifeson wanted to give it a verse and chorus section to make it sound like a "genuine song".

Side two
"Heresy" is a more straightforward rock song with a rhythm that Lee described as a "heart beat pulse" that reflected some of Peart's lyrical ideas for it. Peart was inspired by the events surrounding the fall of Communism in eastern Europe in the early 1990s and people regaining their freedoms.

"Ghost of a Chance" features Lifeson playing a PRS guitar. He rated his solo on the track as one of his best. Lyrically the song is based on the compromises that one makes in a relationship to make it work. Peart was particularly proud of his words for it as he had written a love song that avoided cliches in more typical, sentimental love song lyrics.

Lee said that despite the fun involved in writing "You Bet Your Life", it was the most difficult to record, partly due to getting a balance in the chorus between the vocals and the vocal melody. It was also hard to mix, and Lee "never felt confident that we actually nailed [it]."

Release
Roll the Bones was released on September 3, 1991. It marked a return to commercial success for the band, reaching No. 3 in the US, their highest charting album since Moving Pictures (1981). No. 10 in the UK, and No. 11 in Canada. "Dreamline" reached No. 1 on the US Billboard Album Rock Tracks. In 1992, "Where's My Thing? (Part IV, "Gangster of Boats" Trilogy)" became Rush's second song to be nominated for a Grammy Award for Best Rock Instrumental Performance. The song lost to "Cliffs of Dover" by Eric Johnson, who opened for Rush on the 1991 leg of the Roll the Bones Tour.

Rush supported the album with the Roll the Bones Tour between October 1991 and July 1992, covering Canada, the United States, mainland Europe and the UK. As they had a productive and positive experience making the album, they were keen to go on the road and tour the album and toured longer than they had for Presto.

Reception

Odyssey wrote that the album isn't a classic but that it was Rush's best album since Power Windows (1985). They also wrote that it had a nice and simple hard rock sound. Ultimate Classic Rock included Roll the Bones on their list "Top 100 90's Rock Albums". They also ranked it the 9th (out of 19) best Rush album, writing, "even though synths still clang about and a few of the experiments go too far (um, yes, that's Geddy Lee rapping on the title track), the songwriting is stupendous."

Track listing

Personnel
Rush
Alex Lifeson – electric and acoustic guitars, backing vocals
Neil Peart – drums, cymbals
Geddy Lee – bass guitar, vocals, synthesizers

Additional personnel
Joe Berndt – digital effects
Rupert Hine – additional keyboards, background vocals

Production
Rush – producers
Rupert Hine – producer
Stephen W. Tayler – engineer
Simon Pressey – assistant engineer at Le Studio
Paul Seeley – assistant engineer at McClear Place
Ben Darlow – mixing assistant
Everett Ravestein – pre-production assistant at Lerxst Sound
Bob Ludwig – mastering at Masterdisk NYC
Liam Birt at Anthem Records - executive production
Hugh Syme – art direction, design
Andrew MacNaughtan – portraits
John Scarpati – photography
Joe Berndt – digitals
Adam Ayan – remastering

Charts

Weekly charts

Year-end charts

Certifications

References
Notes:

External links
 

1991 albums
Rush (band) albums
Anthem Records albums
Atlantic Records albums
Albums produced by Rupert Hine
Albums recorded at Le Studio
Juno Award for Rock Album of the Year albums